A broad-leaved, broad-leaf, or broadleaf tree is any tree within the diverse botanical group of angiosperms that has flat leaves and produces seeds inside of fruits. It is one of two general types of trees, the other being a conifer, a tree with needle-like or scale-like leaves and seeds borne in woody cones. Broad-leaved trees are sometimes known as hardwoods.

Most deciduous trees are broad-leaved but some are coniferous, like larches.

Tree types

Gallery

See also

Temperate broadleaf and mixed forests
Mixed coniferous forest
Tropical and subtropical dry broadleaf forests

References

External links
Identifying Broadleaf Trees and Shrubs. CMG Garden Notes. Colorado State University Extension.

Trees
Plant morphology